Kanpur Central (formerly known as Cawnpore North Barracks, station code: CNB) is a central and junction railway station in the city of Kanpur and is one of the five central Indian railway stations. It is third busiest in country after Howrah Jn and New Delhi railway station. It is a major railway station between Howrah Jn and New Delhi. It also holds the record for the largest interlocking route system in the world. All trains passing through this station stop here, including premium trains, and all superfast, mail and passenger trains. The station is a major intercity rail and commuter rail station in the region.

Current and future development 
Kanpur Central has undergone a beautification and modernisation effort in recent years, especially following the inclusion of the station in the "50 World-Class Railway Stations" budget, which sought to modernise Indian railway stations, by former Minister of Railways Mamata Banerjee. These efforts mainly include the improvement of services offered to customers and the redevelopment of existing features, such as the installation of a new platform surface at platform number one. The current phase of development is mainly focused on the cleaning up of the side of the station facing the city, with ₹15 million being budgeted to go towards the project. A food plaza is designated to be built on the second floor and two new car parks are also being proposed.

According to a NCR report the station needs at least 10 more platforms to support the ever-increasing passenger amount. At present, the re-modelling work is proceeding very slowly, but senior NCR officials are hopeful of keeping their promises.

Transport 
A three-layer underground car park has been proposed as well as the installation of two escalators leading to the footbridges passing over the railway lines. By 2010 a new footbridge was constructed at the west end of the station.

Major trains
Major trains that originate from Kanpur Central are:-

Kanpur Central–New Delhi Shram Shakti Express
Kanpur–New Delhi Shatabdi Express
Kanpur Central–Anand Vihar Terminal Express
Kanpur Central–Bandra Terminus Weekly Express
Kanpur Central–Kathgodam Garib Rath Express
Varanasi–Lucknow Charbagh Varuna Express
Prayag Ghat–Kanpur Intercity Express
Pratapgarh–Kanpur Intercity Express
Chitrakootdham (Karwi)–Kanpur Intercity Express
Kanpur Central–Bhiwani Junction Kalindi Express
 Kanpur Central–Valsad Udyog Karmi Express
Kanpur Central–Jammu Tawi Superfast Express
Kanpur Central–Amritsar Weekly Express
Kanpur Central–Durg Junction Betwa Express
Kanpur Central–Balamau Special Express

Electric Loco Shed

Kanpur Loco Shed holds electric locomotives like WAP-4, WAP-7, WAG-7 & WAG-9.

It is currently holds 15 WAP-4, 50+ WAP-7, 70+ WAG-7 & 90+ WAG-9 locomotives respectively.

See also
Indian Railways
Lucknow–Kanpur Suburban Railway
Cawnpore–Burhwal Railway
Cawnpore–Barabanki Railway
Kanpur Bridge Left Bank railway station
Chitrakootdham (Karwi)–Kanpur Intercity Express (via Allahabad)

References

External links

List of trains stopping at Kanpur Central

Railway centrals in India
Railway stations in Kanpur
Railway stations opened in 1930